During the 1994–95 English football season, Queens Park Rangers F.C. competed in the Premier League. They finished the season in 8th place.

Season summary
When manager Gerry Francis moved across London to take charge of Tottenham Hotspur in November, there was much speculation as to who would replace him at Loftus Road. That question was answered within days when the club's board announced that Ray Wilkins, 38, had been appointed as player-manager - just months after he had left the club to become player-coach at Crystal Palace.

Wilkins kept QPR in contention for a UEFA Cup place, and in the end they finished eighth - just three places short of the promised land. This could easily have been achieved had it not been for a nine-match winless run during the season - longer than any winless run in the Premier League that season. He also took them to the quarter-finals of the FA Cup, where they bowed out to Manchester United.

Prolific goalscorer Les Ferdinand was, perhaps inevitably, sold in the summer - subject of a £6 million move to Newcastle United. Wilkins did not delve into the club's funds to buy a replacement, preferring to make the most of young talent like Danny Dichio and Kevin Gallen.

Final league table

Results summary

Results by matchday

Results
Queens Park Rangers' score comes first

Legend

FA Premier League

FA Cup

League Cup

Players

First-team squad
Squad at end of season

Left club during season

Reserve squad

Transfers

In

Out

Transfers in:  £550,000
Transfers out:  £244,000
Total spending:  £306,000

Notes

References

Queens Park Rangers F.C. seasons
Queens Park Rangers